In cryptography, CWC Mode (Carter–Wegman + CTR mode) is an AEAD block cipher mode of operation that provides both encryption and built-in message integrity, similar to CCM and OCB modes. It combines the use of CTR mode for encryption with an efficient polynomial Carter–Wegman MAC and is designed by Tadayoshi Kohno, John Viega and Doug Whiting.

CWC mode was submitted to NIST for standardization, but NIST opted for the similar GCM mode instead.

Although GCM has weaknesses compared to CWC, the GCM authors successfully argued for GCM.

References

External links
 CWC mode home page
 CWC: A high-performance conventional authenticated encryption mode on Cryptology ePrint
 Implementation of CWC on top of AES.

Block cipher modes of operation
Authenticated-encryption schemes